Boonie Bears: Guardian Code is a 2023 computer animated science fiction comedy film. In the film, young Briar and Bramble lose their mother in a forest fire, and many years later, Vick brings them to a robot research institute, where they unexpectedly receive news of their mother. It is the ninth film in the Boonie Bears series and is directed by Lin Yongchang and Shao Heqi.

It was released in China on 22 January 2023 (Chinese New Year). On 5 February, it surpassed US$200 million to become the highest-grossing film in the Boonie Bears franchise.

Original voice cast 
 Zhang Bingjun as Bramble
 Zhang Ming as young Bramble
 Zhang Wei as Briar
 Tan Xiao as Vick
 Miao Yingying
 Jia Chenlu
 Nie Jixuan
 Wang Tianhao
 Wang Siyu

Soundtrack 
The film's main theme "Xing Shan Shan Yue Wan Wan" (星闪闪月弯弯) is sung by Yisa Yu.

Release 
Boonie Bears: Guardian Code was released in China on 22 January 2023 (Chinese New Year).

References

External links 
 

Chinese New Year films
Upcoming films
2023 films
2020s Mandarin-language films
2023 comedy films
2023 computer-animated films
Chinese animated films
2023 in Chinese cinema
2023 science fiction films
Chinese comedy films
Chinese science fiction films
Animated comedy films
Boonie Bears films
Chinese sequel films
Animated films about robots